Rottboellia purpurascens is a species of swamp grass native to tropical Western Africa and the Congo Basin.

References

Andropogoneae
Flora of West Tropical Africa